The 1930 All-Big Ten Conference football team consists of American football players selected to the All-Big Ten Conference teams chosen by various selectors for the 1930 Big Ten Conference football season.

All Big-Ten selections

Ends
 Frank Baker, Northwestern (AP-1, UP-1, NEA-1, Coaches-1, KR-1)
 Wes Fesler, Ohio State (AP-1, UP-1, NEA-1, Coaches-1, KR-1)
 Paul Moss, Purdue (AP-2, UP-2, NEA-2, Coaches-2)
 Milton Gantenbein, Wisconsin (AP-2, UP-2, NEA-2, Coaches-2)
 Ivy Williamson, Michigan (UP-3)
 Laurence E. Oliphant, Northwestern (UP-3)

Tackles
 Milo Lubratovich, Wisconsin (AP-1, UP-1, NEA-1, Coaches-1, KR-1)
 George Van Bibber, Purdue (AP-1, UP-1, NEA-1, Coaches-1, KR-1)
 Dallas Marvil, Northwestern (AP-2, UP-2, NEA-2, Coaches-2)
 Stanley L. Bodman, Illinois (AP-2, UP-3, NEA-2)
 Harold Ely, Iowa (UP-2)
 Tom Samuels, Michigan (Coaches-2)
 Leo Draveling, Michigan (UP-3)

Guards
 Wade Woodworth, Northwestern (AP-1, UP-1, NEA-1 Coaches-1, KR-1)
 Biggie Munn, Minnesota (AP-2, UP-1, NEA-1, Coaches-1)
 Greg Kabat, Wisconsin (AP-1, UP-2, NEA-2, Coaches-2, KR-1)
 George Stears, Purdue (AP-2, UP-2, NEA-2, Coaches-2)
 Horwitz, Chicago (UP-3)
 Joe Zeller, Indiana (UP-3)

Centers
 Maynard Morrison, Michigan (AP-1, UP-1, NEA-1, Coaches-1, KR-1)
 Ookie Miller, Purdue (AP-2, UP-2, NEA-2, Coaches-2)
 Robert E. Clark, Northwestern (UP-3)

Quarterbacks
 Harry Newman, Michigan (AP-1, UP-1, NEA-2, Coaches-1 [hb], KR-1)
 Jack White, Purdue (AP-2, UP-2, NEA-1, Coaches-1)
 Leo Jensvold, Iowa (UP-3)

Halfbacks
 Lee Hanley, Northwestern (AP-1, UP-1, NEA-1, Coaches-2 [quarterback])
 Eddie Risk, Purdue (AP-1, UP-2, Coaches-1, KR-1)
 Lew Hinchman, Ohio State (UP-1, NEA-2)
 Jack Wheeler, Michigan (AP-2, UP-3, NEA-2)
 Gil Berry, Illinois (AP-2, UP-3, NEA-2, Coaches-2, KR-1)
 Hank Bruder, Northwestern (UP-2, Coaches-2, NEA-2 [fullback])

Fullbacks
 Lafayette Russell, Northwestern (AP-2, UP-1, NEA-1, KR-1)
 Pug Rentner, Northwestern (AP-1, Coaches-1)
 Jack Manders, Minnesota (UP-2, Coaches-2)
 Roy Horstmann, Purdue (UP-3)

Key

AP = Associated Press, selected by coaches, referees and sports writers

NEA = Newspaper Enterprise Association

UP = United Press

Coaches = selected by vote of nine of ten head coaches in the Big Ten, with the exception of Amos Alonzo Stagg who declined to participate

KR = Knute Rockne

Bold = Consensus first-team selection of both the AP and UP

See also
1930 College Football All-America Team

References

1930 Big Ten Conference football season
All-Big Ten Conference football teams